Samsonite is a silver manganese antimony sulfosalt mineral with formula Ag4MnSb2S6. It crystallizes in the monoclinic crystal system with a typical slender radiating prismatic habit. It is metallic black to steel black with no cleavage and a brittle to conchoidal fracture. In thin fragments it appears reddish brown in transmitted light and also leaves a red streak. It is soft, Mohs hardness of 2.5, and has a specific gravity of 5.51.

It was first named in 1910 after an occurrence in the Samson Vein of the Sankt Andreasberg silver mines, Harz Mountains, Germany.

See also

 Classification of minerals
 List of minerals

References

Palache, C., H. Berman, and C. Frondel (1944) Dana's system of mineralogy, (7th edition), v. I, pp. 393–395

Antimony minerals
Manganese(II) minerals
Sulfosalt minerals
Silver minerals
Monoclinic minerals
Minerals in space group 14